Mauricio Rodrigo Verón (born 3 July 1977) is an Argentine footballer who plays for Concepción FC in Argentina.

Career
Verón started his senior career with Argentino de Rosario in 1998. In 2000, he moved to Córdoba-based Club Atlético Belgrano, where he spent the 2000–2001 season, his sole one in Primera División. He then signed for South Korean top flight team Ulsan Hyundai.

In the course of his career, Verón accumulated more than 166 caps for multiple clubs of various levels of Argentine football league system, scoring no less than 11 goals in process.

Due to injuries, he only participated in four Atlético Tucumán's matches in the 2008–2009 season.

Honours
Argentino de Rosario
Primera B Metropolitana: Apertura 1998
Primera B Metropolitana: Clausura 1999
Tigre
Primera B Metropolitana: Apertura 2004
Atlético Tucumán
Torneo Argentino A : 2007–08
Primera B Nacional : 2008–09

Personal life
Verón was born in Granadero Baigorria, a city near Rosario, on the western shore of the Paraná River. He likes fishing since his childhood.

References

External links
 Profile at Racing de Córdoba site
 Profile at futbolxxi.com 

Argentine footballers
Argentine expatriate footballers
Expatriate footballers in South Korea
Association football midfielders
1977 births
Living people
Argentine Primera División players
Club Atlético Belgrano footballers
Ulsan Hyundai FC players
Quilmes Atlético Club footballers
Club Atlético Tigre footballers
Atlético Tucumán footballers
Central Córdoba de Rosario footballers
Racing de Córdoba footballers
People from Rosario Department
Argentine expatriate sportspeople in South Korea
Argentino de Rosario footballers
Sportspeople from Santa Fe Province